Joseph Frederick Motiki (born July 31, 1972) is a Canadian television host, actor, and performer. He is best known for hosting the TVOntario children's block The TVOKids Crawlspace and the Food Network game show Ice Cold Cash.

Early life
Joseph Motiki was born in Toronto, Ontario after his parents emigrated from their native South Africa to live in Canada. He grew up in the Borough of East York and attended high school at East York Collegiate Institute. He was an honours student who was active in athletics, and was president of the student government. Motiki enrolled at Ryerson University and graduated from their Radio and Television Arts program.

Career
While attending school, he beat out 350 people to become the host of What, a late night phone-in show for a youth audience on TVOntario. The pilot episode aired on May 30, 1994, and the show was broadcast live on Tuesday nights starting September 27, 1994, for one season. Dealing with issues related to current events and popular culture, What was nominated for the 1995 Gemini Award for Best Youth Program in Canada.

In March 1995, Motiki became co-host of The TVOKids Crawlspace, TVOntario's after school block of children's programs, alongside Patty Sullivan and Kevin Brauch. Three months later Motiki officially replaced Brauch, who left to host other shows on TVO. Patty and Joe appeared in live interstitial breaks between shows such as Art Attack, Arthur, Bill Nye the Science Guy, and The Magic School Bus. During these segments they would read viewer mail, promote TV shows, and perform a wide array of original characters.  Motiki spent four years on TVOKids, appearing at live events in Ontario and helping the show achieve its highest ratings ever or since. He left The Crawlspace on May 30, 1999.

Pursuing new projects, Motiki continued to host various programs and live events. He also started voice acting in several animated television series. His first was Crashbox on HBO, playing the digitally enhanced stop-motion character Professor Rocket, both on the show and in a cycle of shorts entitled Who Knew?. He then provided the voice of Rocky Canyon for the TV series Rescue Heroes, subsequently voicing Rocky Canyon for the Fisher-Price action figures and the 2003 film Rescue Heroes: The Movie. He also voiced Metabee in the TV series Medabots.

In 2002 Motiki hosted the first two seasons of an updated version of the teen quiz show Reach for the Top, which was a high school competition for the provincial SchoolReach trivia championship. That same year Motiki became host of POV Sports on CBC, a showcase for athletes and sports both professional and amateur. During his two seasons on POV Sports, Motiki travelled across North America to cover stories and events, including the Gravity Games, the 91st Grey Cup, the historic 2003 Heritage Classic from Commonwealth Stadium, and X Games IX in Los Angeles, California. He also worked with CBC Sports on the 90th Grey Cup broadcast, the 2003 Canada Games in New Brunswick, and the IAAF World Youth Championships in Athletics from Sherbrooke, Quebec where he interviewed current 100m and 200m world record holder Usain Bolt.

Sports From The Edge is a documentary that Motiki hosted in 2004, produced by Keith MacNeill of CBC North. The documentary follows native athlete Steve Amarualik from his training in Resolute Bay, Nunavut, to his performance at the 2004 Arctic Winter Games in Fort McMurray, Alberta; it was honoured at the prestigious Columbus International Film Festival. He travelled to Asia, Australia, and Europe to host the travel show Get Outta Town on Encore with Barbara Mamabolo, a TV series about how young people live around the world. Motiki also served three times as host of the provincial Junior and Senior Championships of the Spelling Bee of Canada in 2006 and served three times as host of the Miss World Canada event. From 2007 to 2008 he hosted the YTV game show Game Gurus.

Motiki played constituency assistant Trevor Jones in the comedy series She's the Mayor for VisionTV, with Janet-Laine Green, Scott Wentworth, Denis Akiyama, Tonya Williams, and Colin Mochrie. The series, about a retired school principal who becomes mayor of the fictional town of Fairfax, was Vision's first original production and the broadcaster's second-most watched TV series during its run. He also appeared in TV shows such as Degrassi: The Next Generation and Wingin' It; films such as Blindness and Phantom Punch; and voiced characters for several animated TV series, such as Life's a Zoo.tv, which won the 2009 Gemini Award for Best Animated Series, and Rescue Heroes.

He has made numerous appearances on projects across various platforms. He played himself on the Canadian web series The Casting Room with its creator Naomi Snieckus, and was a guest on the online podcast Deekast with Derek Veenhof, where he discussed numerous subjects including his career beginnings at TVOntario.

In 2012, Motiki hosted the Food Network production Ice Cold Cash where he pretended to be an ice cream vendor who would surprise customers with questions about food and award them cash prizes for correct answers. He was the in-stadium Athletics host for both the 2015 Pan American Games and 2015 Parapan American Games; events were held at York Lions Stadium, which was known as CIBC Athletics Stadium during the Games.

In 2016, he hosted the live show CSP Live from the producers of Canada's Smartest Person. The Facebook-exclusive broadcast gives viewers the opportunity to compete interactively in challenges based on the theory of multiple intelligences presented them by Motiki.

Filmography

Film

Television

References

External links
 
 
 
 
 
 Black In Canada

1972 births
Living people
Canadian game show hosts
Canadian male television actors
Canadian male voice actors
Canadian people of South African descent
Black Canadian broadcasters
Black Canadian male actors
Male actors from Toronto
People from East York, Toronto
Toronto Metropolitan University alumni